Dylan Thompson (born October 24, 1991) is an American football coach and former quarterback who currently serves as a character coach for the Houston Texans. He played college football at South Carolina. Thompson performed backup signal caller duties for the majority of his career, however after the graduation of Connor Shaw, he was named the starting quarterback for the Gamecocks during the 2014 season.

Early years
Thompson attended Boiling Springs High School in Boiling Springs, South Carolina, where he played football and basketball, earning scholarship offers for both sports. He signed with South Carolina on June 15, 2009.

College career
After redshirting during the 2010 season, Thompson's first significant amount of play time would come during the 2012 season. He earned his first career start on September 8, 2012, after Connor Shaw was injured during the season opener at Vanderbilt. Thompson would use that opportunity to lead the Gamecocks to a 48-10 route of East Carolina. He finished the season with 66 completions on 127 passing attempts, netting 1,027 passing yards and 11 touchdowns (1 rushing).

In 2013, Thompson again performed backup duties. He played in 10 of the Gamecocks' 13 games, earning a start at conference foe Missouri. Thompson finished the season with 52 completions on 89 passing attempts, netting 783 passing yards and 5 touchdowns (1 rushing).

Prior to the 2014 season, Gamecock head football coach, Steve Spurrier, named Thompson as the starting quarterback. Thompson started all 13 games for the Gamecocks. Despite his record-breaking offensive performance, he led the team to a comparatively lackluster season, largely due to poor defensive play. He would end the season (and his college career) with a 24–21 victory over the Miami Hurricanes in the 2014 Independence Bowl and as the SEC leader in several passing statistics.

Professional career

San Francisco 49ers
After going undrafted in the 2015 NFL Draft, Thompson signed with the San Francisco 49ers on May 5, 2015. He joined former Gamecock teammates Bruce Ellington and Mike Davis on the 49ers. Thompson was released by the 49ers on September 5, 2015, due to roster cuts.

Thompson was signed to the 49ers' practice squad on September 6, 2015. He was promoted to the active roster on November 21, 2015, as backup to Blaine Gabbert after Colin Kaepernick was placed on injured reserve for the rest of the season. On May 6, 2016, Thompson was released by the 49ers.

Los Angeles Rams
On June 7, 2016, Thompson was signed by the Los Angeles Rams. On August 30, 2016, he was released by the Rams.

On May 30, 2017, Thompson was re-signed by the Rams. He was waived by the Rams on June 15, 2017.

Coaching career

Charleston Southern 
In September of 2017, Thompson was hired as Director of Player Development for the Charleston Southern Buccaneers men's basketball team.  He was hired on the recommendation of Jack Easterby.

Detroit Lions 
In 2018, Thompson was hired by the Detroit Lions as the team's character coach. While he assists with many programs his main duties are to help players with the NFL transition and to help with support off of the field.

Houston Texans 
On February 11, 2021, Thompson was hired as the Director of Team Development for the Houston Texans, reuniting him with former South Carolina chaplain and former Texans executive Jack Easterby.

References

External links
South Carolina Gamecocks bio
Sports-Reference statistics

1991 births
Living people
Players of American football from South Carolina
People from Boiling Springs, South Carolina
American football quarterbacks
South Carolina Gamecocks football players
San Francisco 49ers players
Los Angeles Rams players